7–9 was a television entertainment programme which aired on SVT between 5 September 1992 – 22 May 1993. One of the events was Tiotusenkronorsfrågan.

References

Sveriges Television original programming